Hirsch Bär Fassel (1802-1883; also known as Hirsch Baer Fassel or Hirsch B. Fassel) was an influential rabbi and philosopher. He was born in Boskowitz. His book Mozene Zedek, a manual for rabbis on Talmudic decisions on practical matters, urged other rabbis to be lenient in making rulings against individuals in non-criminal matters. Fassel believed that reforms in Judaism were legitimate, so long as they were brought about by rabbis. He preached in German and allowed the consumption of kitniyot during Passover. He served as the rabbi of Proßnitz until 1851 and then in Nagykanizsa until his death in 1883.

Hirsch was a prolific writer who often had his sermons published in the Jewish press, and who was a frequent contributor to Austrian Jewish newspapers. In addition to Mozene Zedek, he wrote and published at least a dozen other books.

His manuscript of Mozene Zedek is on display at the Hebrew Union College.

His daughter Rosa Sonneschein was the founder of the American Jewess.

Books 
 Mozene Zedek
 Zwei Gottesdienstliche Vorträge, Gehalten in der Synagoge zu Prossnitz
 Ḥoreb Beẓayon: Briefe eines Jüdischen Gelehrten und Rabbinen über das Werk "Ḥoreb" von S. R. Hirsch
 Reis- und Hülsenfrüchte am Pesach Erlaubte Speisen
 Ein Wort zur Zeit beim Dankfeste für die Errungenschaft der Freiheit
 Ẓedeḳ u-Mishpaṭ, Tugend- und Rechtslehre, Bearbeitet nach den Principien des Talmuds und nach der Form der Philosophie
 Die Epidemie: Trauer- und Gedenkrede
 Mishpeṭe El: das Mosaisch-Rabbinische Civilrecht, Bearbeitet nach Anordnung und Eintheilung der Gerichtsordnungen der Neuzeit und Erläutert mit Angabe der Quellen.
 Ḳol Adonai: die Zehn Worte des Bundes
 'Asot Mishpaṭ: das Mosaisch-Rabbinische Gerichtsverfahren in Civilrechtlichen Sachen, Bearbeitet nach Anordnung und Eintheilung der Gerichtsordnungen der Neuzeit und Erläutert mit Angabe der Quellen
 Dat Mosheh we-Yisrael: die Mosaisch-Rabbinische Religionslehre, Katechetisch für den Unterricht Bearbeitet. 
 Dibre Elohim Ḥay, Neun Derusch-Vorträge
 We-Shafeṭu we-Hiẓẓilu: das Mosaisch-Rabbinische Strafrecht und Strafrechtliche Gerichtsverfahren, Bearbeitet nach Anordnung und Eintheilung der Gesetzbücher der Neuzeit und Erläutert mit Angabe der Quellen

References 

19th-century Czech people
Moravian rabbis
Jewish philosophers
Czech philosophers
Austrian philosophers
Austro-Hungarian rabbis
People from Boskovice
1802 births
1883 deaths